Mystic Heroes is a hack and slash video game developed by Koei. The game is loosely based on Investiture of the Gods, a Chinese supernatural novel about the fall of the Shang Dynasty and the rise of the Zhou Dynasty.

Gameplay
Mystic Heroes is a hack and slash similar to Koei's Dynasty Warriors. Players can perform melee attacks and element spells, which become more powerful with continuous use. The game has eight stages.

There are four playable characters, and four unlockable characters in the PS2 version, for a total of eight. The game features a single-player story mode and three additional single-player modes, as well as co-op and versus multiplayer. The game levels take place in a variety of settings from deserts, to castles, to swamps. The enemies are consistently soldiers, but have a variety of different bosses depending upon the level.

Plot
Long ago in a legendary land, Emperor Kang and his wife Sheva ruled with an iron fist. Tai and Naja, two elite mystics, sealed them away in Mt. Houshin, thus restoring peace. But Kang's son, Cyrus, built up an army to battle the mystics in an attempt to free his father. At this time two more mystics, Shiga and Lani, joined the fight alongside Tai and Naja. The four mystics along with their friends once again saved the land and returned the peace. Now Emperor Kang, Sheva, and Generals Grifon and Kai start to plan their escape. Grifon brings up the existence of something known as the "Dragon Star", which could free them. Kang calls upon the powers of the Dragon Star, and he along with all of his minions are set free, giving Kang the chance to rise once again to dominate the land. This game takes place after Hōshin Engi, Magical Hōshin (this game takes place after the first title) and Hōshin Engi 2.

The player can choose to play as Tai, Shiga, Lani, or Naja.

Reception

Mystic Heroes received above-average reviews on both platforms according to the review aggregation website Metacritic.

In Japan, Famitsu gave the game a score of 33 out of 40 for the GameCube version, 32 out of 40 for the PS2 version, and 30 out of 40 for the Game Boy Advance version.

References

External links
 Mystic Heroes official site
 
 

2002 video games
GameCube games
Game Boy Advance games
Koei games
PlayStation 2 games
PlayStation Network games
Video games about magic
Video games based on novels
Video games developed in Japan
Works based on Investiture of the Gods